Rahul Prakash Kol (4 August 19832 February 2023) was an Indian politician and a member of the 17th and 18th Legislative Assembly from Chhanbey, in the Indian state of Uttar Pradesh. He was a member of the Apna Dal (Sonelal) party. He died on 2 February 2023 due to cancer at a hospital in Mumbai, Maharashtra.

Political career
Rahul Prakash became a member of the 17th and 18th Legislative Assembly of Uttar Pradesh in 2017 and 2022.

Posts held

See also
Uttar Pradesh Legislative Assembly

References

Uttar Pradesh MLAs 2017–2022
Apna Dal (Sonelal) politicians
Living people
Year of birth missing (living people)
Uttar Pradesh MLAs 2022–2027